Tokmac Chol Nguen (born 20 October 1993) is a Norwegian professional footballer who plays as a winger for Hungarian club Ferencváros. Born in Kenya to South Sudanese refugees, Nguen represents the Norway national team.

Club career

In Norway
Nguen made his debut for Strømsgodset on 28 August 2011 against Fredrikstad. The game ended 1–1.

He was injured most of the 2012 season, and only played four minutes in one match as a sub. In 2013, when his team became champions, he was subbed on in two matches, with a combined 17 minutes of play. In 2014 he was used as a sub in three matches, playing 76 minutes in total, as well as a cup game.

On 6 August 2014, he was loaned out to 1. Divisjon club Bærum for the remainder of the 2014 season.

On 10 August 2015, he was loaned out to Tippeligaen club Mjøndalen for the rest of the 2015 season.

Ferencváros
In June 2020, Nguen was given a written warning by the Hungarian Football Federation for celebrating his goal for Ferencvárosi TC against Puskás Akadémia FC by displaying a message on his undershirt condemning the murder of George Floyd. Ferencváros ultras are notoriously oriented towards the political right, so they did not necessarily approve of this political message.

On 16 June 2020, he became champion with Ferencváros by beating Budapest Honvéd FC at the Hidegkuti Nándor Stadion on the 30th match day of the 2019–20 Nemzeti Bajnokság I season.

On 29 September 2020, he was member of the Ferencváros team which qualified for the 2020–21 UEFA Champions League group stage after beating Molde FK on 3–3 aggregate (away goals) at the Groupama Aréna.

In the first round of the 2020–21 UEFA Champions League he scored twice against 2019 Allsvenskan-winner Djurgårdens IF Fotboll at Groupama Aréna on 19 August 2020. He scored his first group stage goal against FC Dynamo Kiev, a 59th minute goal to bring the match to 2-1. Ferencváros would eventually equalize in the 90th minute.

On 20 April 2021, Ferencváros won the 2020–21 Nemzeti Bajnokság I season by beating archrival Újpest FC 3–0 at the Groupama Aréna. The goals were scored by Myrto Uzuni (3rd and 77th minute) and Nguen (30th minute).

In Hungary, he is nicknamed "tökmag", Hungarian for pumpkin seed, for his short stature.

International career
Nguen was born in a refugee camp in Kenya to South Sudanese Dinka father and an Ethiopian Oromo mother, and moved to Norway at the age of 5. Nguen has made appearances for the Norway U18, and U19 squads. He was called up by the South Sudan national team in September 2019, but did not want to join the team, since he wanted to play for Norway. He was called up by the Norway national team in March 2021. He made his debut for Norway on 24 March 2021 in a World Cup qualifier against Gibraltar.

Career statistics

Club

Honours
Strømsgodset
Tippeligaen: 2013

Ferencváros
Nemzeti Bajnokság I: 2018–19, 2019–20, 2020–21, 2021–22
Magyar Kupa: 2021–22

References

External links
 

1993 births
Living people
People from Rift Valley Province
Norwegian footballers
Norway international footballers
Norway youth international footballers
South Sudanese footballers
South Sudanese emigrants to Norway
Sportspeople of South Sudanese descent
Norwegian people of Ethiopian descent
South Sudanese people of Ethiopian descent
Association football wingers
Strømsgodset Toppfotball players
Bærum SK players
Mjøndalen IF players
Ferencvárosi TC footballers
Eliteserien players
Nemzeti Bajnokság I players
Norwegian expatriate footballers
Norwegian expatriate sportspeople in Hungary
South Sudanese expatriate footballers
Expatriate footballers in Hungary
South Sudanese expatriate sportspeople in Hungary
South Sudanese refugees
Refugees in Kenya
Sportspeople from Drammen